Durant School District may refer to:

 Durant Public School District, Durant, Mississippi, USA
 Durant Independent School District, Durant, Oklahoma, USA
 Durant Community School District, Cedar County, Iowa, USA